TASR may refer to:
 News Agency of the Slovak Republic – Slovak news agency
 TASER International (NASDAQ: TASR) – developer, manufacturer, and distributor of less-lethal electroshock guns in the United States